Shuklatirth is a holy village and a tourist attraction in Bharuch district, Gujarat, India. It is famous for its five temples.

Location 
It is 18 Kilometers far from Bharuch and situated in the bank of Narmada River. Its location code is 01575500.

References 

Villages in Bharuch district